The Little Arkansas River is a river in the central Great Plains of North America. A tributary of the Arkansas River, its entire  length lies within the American state of Kansas.

Geography

The river originates in central Kansas in the Smoky Hills region of the Great Plains. Its source lies in extreme south-central Ellsworth County immediately north of Geneseo, Kansas. From there, the river flows generally south-southeast along the border between the Arkansas River Lowlands to the southwest and the McPherson Lowlands to the northeast. It joins the Arkansas River immediately northwest of downtown Wichita, Kansas.

Points of interest
A statue, The Keeper of the Plains by local artist Blackbear Bosin, marks the confluence of these two rivers.

See also
List of rivers of Kansas

References

External links

Rivers of Kansas
Tributaries of the Arkansas River
Rivers of Sedgwick County, Kansas
Rivers of Reno County, Kansas
Rivers of Harvey County, Kansas
Rivers of McPherson County, Kansas
Rivers of Rice County, Kansas
Rivers of Ellsworth County, Kansas